The Samarth-class offshore patrol vessel are a series of eleven offshore patrol vessels being built by Goa Shipyard Limited for the Indian Coast Guard. The construction of Samarth class was motivated by a desire to triple the Coast Guard assets in the aftermath of 2008 Mumbai attacks. They are an improvement over the earlier , with a larger beam and more powerful engines. The ships are being constructed in two batches—a batch of six ordered in May 2012 that was completed in December 2017 and a follow-on batch of five ordered in August 2016.

History
Following the 2008 Mumbai attacks, the Indian Government initiated a program to triple the Indian Coast Guard force, assets and infrastructure. Thereafter in accordance with it a 'request for information' for acquisition of six offshore patrol vessels was issued by the Ministry of Defence on 1 April 2010. After technical evaluation and commercial bids a contract worth $400 million or Rs. 1800 crore was signed with GSL on 9 May 2012 to build six vessels.

On 14 May 2012 GSL did the first steel cutting in its shipyard, and the  keel-laying ceremony of the first of the new class of offshore patrol vessels was held at Vasco da Gama on 28 September 2012. The second and third vessels were laid down 28 January and 11 October 2013, and the fourth on 9 January 2014. The first vessel was commissioned on 10 November 2015 and all six will be commissioned by the end of 2017. 

In August 2016, a follow-on consisting of five patrol vessels was placed for INR 20 billion. The follow-on vessels will have a greater indigenous content of 70% compared to the 62% of the previous batch.

Sachet the first OPV was launched on 21 February 2019 and commissioned on 15 May 2020 by Defence Minister Rajnath Singh by video conferencing.

Sujeet the second OPV from the second batch was handed to Indian Coast Guard on 12 November 2020 and later commissioned on 15 December 2020.

Sajag the third OPV was delivered ahead of time on 16 March 2021. The ship was commissioned by NSA Ajit Doval on May 29, 2021.

Sarthak was delivered ahead of schedule and was commissioned in the Indian Coast Guard on 28 October, 2021.

Saksham the last ship of the project was delivered ahead of schedule on 8 February, 2022. All 5 ships of the Fleet 2 were delivered ahead of schedule.

Description
Features include Integrated Bridge System, Integrated Machinery Control System, Power Management System and High Power External Fire Fighting System. They are designed to carry one twin engine Light Helicopter and five high speed boats including two Palfinger QRIBs for fast boarding operations, search and rescue, law enforcement and maritime patrol. The class is also capable of carrying pollution response equipment to combat oil spill contamination at sea.

Ships of the class

See also
L&T Interceptor class fast attack craft
Solas Marine Fast Interceptor Boat
Couach fast interceptor boats
Cochin Fast Patrol Vessels
ABG fast interceptor craft

Gallery

References

Patrol ship classes
Ships of the Indian Coast Guard